Jurish is a Palestinian town in the Nablus Governorate in northern West Bank, located 27 kilometers Southeast of Nablus. According to the Palestinian Central Bureau of Statistics (PCBS), the town had a population of 1,384 inhabitants in mid-year 2006.

Location
It is bordered by Tal al Khashabe to the east, Aqraba to the north, Qabalan to the north and west, Talfit to the west, and Qusra and Majdal Bani Fadil to the south.

History
Sherds from the  Early Bronze, Middle Bronze, Iron Age I, IA II, Hellenistic and the  Roman era have been found here.

It has been suggested that Jurish was the birthplace of the rebel leader Simeon Bar-Giora, and that the place was later destroyed by the Roman general Vespasian.

Conder and Kitchener remarked that to the north-east of Jurish was "a sacred place," adding that the site "appears to be the ancient Capharetæa (Kefr 'Atya), a Samaritan town, mentioned by Justin Martyr. The two sites are, in fact, one, and the ruin apparently preserves the old name."

Sherds from the Umayyad/Abbasid and  Mamluk eras have also been found here.

Ottoman era
The population was 16 households, all Muslim. They paid a  fixed  tax rate of 33,3% on agricultural products, such as  wheat, barley, summer crops, olive trees, goats and beehives, in addition to occasional revenues and a fixed tax for people of Nablus area; a total of 2,000 akçe. In the same tax-records, nearby Kafr 'Atiyya (at grid 181/167) had a population of 40 Muslim households, and paid 9,000 akçe in revenue. Sherds from the early Ottoman era have also been found here.

In 1852, Edward Robinson, passing among "so much good land; so many fine and arable, though not large plains," noted Jurish on a southern hill. In the same year, van de Velde described land near Jurish as "exceedingly beautiful and fertile. I had here a ride of an hour through valleys of such rare beauty and natural richness, that I feel myself quite unable to give you an adequate conception of it." The village itself provided excellent accommodation and hospitality for visitors.

In 1870 Victor Guérin came from the north, noted first the ruins of Kefr A'athia, where corn was planted among the ruins. He then came to the spring Ain Jurish, where water was collected in a rectangular basin. He then continued to the top of the hill, where the village Jurish was situated. It had once been much larger, but was now reduced to about 20 inhabited houses. A shrine was consecrated to a Sheikh Hatem.

In 1882, the Palestine Exploration Fund's  "Survey of Western Palestine" (SWP) described Jurish as: "A small village on a hill-top, with olives to the east."

British Mandate era
In the  1922 census of Palestine conducted by the British Mandate authorities, Jurish  had a population of 195 Muslims, increasing in the 1931 census when Jurish, together with Kafr 'Atiya had to 236  Muslim inhabitants,  in 59  houses.

In  the 1945 statistics  the population of Jurish (with Kafr Atiya) was 340 Muslims,  while the total land area was 8,207 dunams, according to an official land and population survey. Of  this,  1,358 dunams were allocated  for plantations and irrigable land, 4,249 for cereals, while 14 dunams were classified as built-up areas.

Jordanian era
In the wake of the 1948 Arab–Israeli War, and after the 1949 Armistice Agreements, Jurish came under Jordanian rule.

The Jordanian census of 1961 found 419 inhabitants.

Post-1967
Since the Six-Day War in 1967,  Jurish has been under  Israeli occupation.

After the 1995 accords, 62% of village land has been defined as Area B land, while the remaining 38% is Area C. Israel has confiscated 17 dunums of Jurish village land for the construction of the Israeli settlement of Migdalim, in addition to confiscating land for the road Route 505.

In October, 2021, it was reported that Israeli settlers set fire to olive trees belonging to Jurish, on land close to Migdalim.

References

Bibliography

External links
 Welcome To Jurish
Survey of Western Palestine, Map 15:    IAA,  Wikimedia commons 
Jurish Village Profile,  Applied Research Institute–Jerusalem, ARIJ
   Jurish, aerial photo, ARIJ
Development priorities and needs in Jurish , ARIJ

Nablus Governorate
Villages in the West Bank
Municipalities of the State of Palestine